Sase is a village in the municipality of Srebrenica, Bosnia and Herzegovina.

See also
Sase Monastery

References

Populated places in Srebrenica